The  Military Bishopric of Paraguay  is a military ordinariate of the Roman Catholic Church. Immediately subject to the Holy See, it provides pastoral care to Roman Catholics serving in the Paraguayan Armed Forces and their families.

History
It was established as a military vicariate on 20 December 1961, but the first military vicar was not appointed until 7 December 1965. It was elevated to a military ordinariate on 21 July 1986.

Office holders

Military vicars
 Augustin Rodríguez (appointed 7 December 1965 – died 1969)
 Juan Moleón Andreu (appointed 1 February 1972 – died 20 September 1980 )
 No military vicars (1980–1986).

Military ordinaries
 No military ordinaries (1986–1992).
 Pastor Cuquejo, C.Ss.R. (appointed 5 May 1992 – transferred to the Archdiocese of Asunción 15 June 2002)
 Ricardo Valenzuela Rios (appointed 24 May 2003 – transferred to the Diocese of Villarrica del Espíritu Santo 25 Jun 2010)
 Adalberto Martínez Flores (appointed 14 Mar 2012 - transferred to the Diocese of Villarrica del Espíritu Santo 23 Jun 2018)

References

 Military Ordinariate of Paraguay  (Catholic-Hierarchy)
 Obispado de las Fuerzas Armadas y la Policia Nacional del Paraguay (GCatholic.org)

Paraguay
Paraguay
1961 establishments in Paraguay